This was the first edition of the tournament.

Taro Daniel won the title after defeating Leonardo Mayer 5–7, 6–3, 6–4 in the final.

Seeds

Draw

Finals

Top half

Bottom half

References
Main Draw
Qualifying Draw

Copa Ciudad de Tigre - Singles